Resnik is an urban neighborhood of Belgrade, Serbia. It is located in Belgrade's municipality of Rakovica.

Location 
Resnik is located in the southern section of the municipality and makes the southernmost point of the urban Belgrade City Proper. Originally a village distant from Belgrade, which developed between the valleys of the creek of Rakovički potok and the Topčiderka river. The creek of Pariguz flows through the southern parts of Resnik before it empties into the Topčiderka. The settlement is roughly triangularly shaped and bordered by the settlements of Sunčani Breg, Jelezovac, Straževica (north), Petlovo Brdo and Kijevo (north-west) which make Resnik's urban connection to the rest of Belgrade. The other three sides are still not urbanized (fields of Klik, Mandrine, Hladna Voda, Pašinac, etc.).

Kadinac creek flows into the Topčiderka west of the neighborhood. As it grows, Resnik almost makes a continuously built-up area with Rušanj on the south, and Pinosava on the south-east.

History 
The village of Resnik was mentioned in Ottoman defter from 1528. It had 17 houses in 1713 and 33 in 1718. First school was open in 1842.

Resnik was a separate village and had its own municipality from 1832 until the 1959/1960 administrative reform, when became part of the Čukarica municipality. In 1972, it lost a separate settlement status and became part of the Belgrade urban proper. When municipality of Rakovica was reconstructed in 1974 from part of Čukarica, Resnik became part of it. It continued to be the seat of the local community, a sub-municipal administrative unit. By the 1981 census it was divided in two (Resnik and Avala Grad) and in 2010 two new local communities were created: Železnička Stanica Resnik and Sunčani Breg.

When the neighboring Kijevo lost its separate settlement status in 1959, the majority of its area was attached to the village of Kneževac, but one small part became a cadastral part of Resnik.

From the 1970s, local entrepreneurs attempted to turn Resnik into the nightlife attraction. In the 1970s, a club "Resnik" was opened in the former adult movie theater which was closed by the authorities. In the 1980s, a club "Cvetni Breg" was also opened. Though gaining some prominence, the move ultimately failed as the venues, being distant from downtown, weren't much attended.

Characteristics 

Resnik is predominantly residential settlement. It is close to the important traffic routes: the valley of Rakovički potok is a route to the Kružni put, suburban road of Belgrade and the future part of the projected Belgrade beltway, and a Belgrade-Požarevac railway, while the valley of Topčiderka is a route to the Belgrade-Niš railway. Resnik has a railway stations on both railways (northern one is officially styled Jajinci but it is far from that neighborhood). Tunnels are constructed on both road and railway passing through the northern section of Resnik.

The building industry develops along the Kružni put as a series of construction companies, cement plants and a building material's depots are located there. An open green market (kvantaš) is also located on the road.

The artificial lake Pariguz is a well-known attraction in the area. It was made in 1989/90 and named after the nearby creek. It is a popular summer destination for many inhabitants of Resnik and for Belgraders who have weekend-houses in the area, even though the water was never tested and the banks are not arranged. Lake Pariguz was the proposed site of the 3rd European Peoples Global Action held in 2004, before it was moved to Jajinci.

Sub-neighborhoods

Avala Grad 
Urban settlement built in the period from the 1970s to the 1990s.

Patin Majdan 

South-eastern extension of the neighborhood, in the direction of Pinosava. It is located on the Topčiderka river and is prone to flash floods during the heavy rains.

Sunčani Breg 

Formerly the northernmost extension of Resnik, across the railway, in the Miljakovac direction. Split into the separate local community in 2010.

Transport 
Resnik has its own railway station. Resnik railway station was located on the, now defunct, regional express network of BG Voz. On 13 April 2018, it became part of BG Voz, Belgrade's urban rail system, which connected Resnik with the Belgrade Centre railway station in Prokop. The projected commuting time, via Kijevo, Kneževac, Rakovica, Košutnjak and Topčider (the train will not stop at the last two stations), is calculated at only 18 minutes.

Neighbourhood is served by five bus lines from GSP Belgrade; 47 (Slavija - Resnik), 94 (New Belgrade - Resnik), 503 (Voždovac - Resnik), 504 (Vidikovac - Resnik)  and 506 (Patin majdan - Resnik), also a line passing through the settlement is 507 (Kneževac - Rušanj)

Future 
In September 2007 an official motion was started by the municipality of Voždovac to create new sub-Avalan municipality (Avalski Venac), which would include the settlements of Ripanj, Beli Potok, Pinosava and Zuce from Voždovac, Vrčin from the municipality of Grocka and Resnik. It was supported by the local Voždovac administration headed by the Democratic Party at the time, but not by the members of the same party on the city level. It was also proposed by the political party G17 Plus in 2010 and Nova Stranka in 2015, but with Resnik remaining in Rakovica.

Gallery

References

Neighborhoods of Belgrade
Rakovica, Belgrade